In enzymology, a salicyl-alcohol beta-D-glucosyltransferase is an enzyme that catalyzes the chemical reaction

UDP-glucose + salicyl alcohol  UDP + salicin

Thus, the two substrates of this enzyme are UDP-glucose and salicyl alcohol, whereas its two products are UDP and salicin.

This enzyme belongs to the family of glycosyltransferases, specifically the hexosyltransferases.  The systematic name of this enzyme class is UDP-glucose:salicyl-alcohol beta-D-glucosyltransferase. Other names in common use include uridine diphosphoglucose-salicyl alcohol 2-glucosyltransferase, and UDPglucose:salicyl alcohol phenyl-glucosyltransferase.

References

 

EC 2.4.1
Enzymes of unknown structure